Eugene Raymond Johnson (February 14, 1902 – December 27, 1989) was an American football and basketball coach. Some sources list him as the head coach of the 1936 United States Olympic basketball team and other sources give that honor to Jimmy Needles and state that Johnson was the assistant coach. His innovations in basketball include being credited with creating the full court press.

Basketball

Wichita
In 1928, at the age of 26, Johnson was named head coach at Wichita University (now called Wichita State University) in Wichita, Kansas. Johnson's teams compiled a record of 74 wins and 24 losses in his five years as head coach of the "Shockers". He led the Shockers to a Central Intercollegiate Conference co-championship in 1933 (his last season at the school) and the team finished second three times and third once.

McPherson Globe Refiners (AAU)
After coaching at Wichita University, Johnson left for a coaching career in the Amateur Athletic Union, coaching the McPherson Globe Refiners to a national title and later coaching the Wichita Vickers.

USA Olympic Basketball
Johnson was an assistant coach of the first United States Olympic basketball team in 1936. Several of his players in his AAU teams, including his brother Francis Johnson.

Kansas Wesleyan
In 1938, Johnson went to Kansas Wesleyan University to become the head basketball coach. He led the team to several conference championships and as of 2005 holds the second-most wins for a single season at the school.

College football
Johnson was the tenth head football coach at Kansas Wesleyan, serving for five seasons, from 1938 until 1942, and compiling a record of 19–16–9.

In 1940, the team was declared conference champions of the Kansas Collegiate Athletic Conference by outscoring their opponents for the season 131 to 46 and by winning every home game.

NIBL
In 1955–56 and 1956–57 Johnson coached the Wichita Vickers of the AAU National Industrial Basketball League. In 1957–58, he coached the Kansas City Kaycees and in 1959–60 he coached the NIBL Seattle Buchan Bakers.

Head coaching record

Football

References

1902 births
1989 deaths
American men's basketball coaches
American men's basketball players
College men's basketball head coaches in the United States
Emporia State Hornets basketball players
Kansas Wesleyan Coyotes football coaches
Kansas Wesleyan Coyotes men's basketball coaches
Wichita State Shockers men's basketball coaches
College of Emporia Fighting Presbies football players
People from Emporia, Kansas
Players of American football from Kansas
Basketball coaches from Kansas
Basketball players from Kansas